Ambahikily is a municipality in Madagascar. It belongs to the district of Morombe, which is a part of Atsimo-Andrefana Region. The population of this municipality is 58,027 inhabitants.
It is situated on the National road 55 and in the Mangoky River delta.

Primary and junior level secondary education are available in town. The majority 80% of the population of the commune are farmers, while an additional 13% receives their livelihood from raising livestock. The most important crop is rice, while other important products are lima beans and cowpeas. Services provide employment for 2% of the population. Additionally fishing employs 5% of the population.

References 

Populated places in Atsimo-Andrefana